Sir Alfred George Marten, QC (8 November 1829 – 22 June 1910, in St Leonards-on-Sea) was an English politician and barrister. He was Member of Parliament for Cambridge, between 1874 and 1880, as a member of the Conservative Party. In 1896, he was appointed a County Court Judge.

Life
Alfred George Marten was born in 1829 into a non-conformist family, the third son of Robert Giles Marten of Plaistow, Essex. His father's and grandfather's business was in shipbroking and insurance in the city of London. However, both his father and grandfather died in 1839. Alfred went to Mill Hill School and then on to St John's College Cambridge. He qualified as a barrister at the Inner Temple and became a fellow of St John's in 1870.

He married Patricia Barrington Kennett, dau. of Capt. Vincent Frederick Kennett, in 1869. His children included Sir Amberson Barrington Marten and Sir Clarence Henry Kennett Marten.

He died in St Leonards-on-Sea in 1910, aged 80.

References

Sources

"The Marten Papers held at Cambridge University Library", nationalarchives.gov.uk. Accessed 6 January 2023.
"History Site of the Marten Family of Plaistow"

External links 
 

1829 births
1910 deaths
Conservative Party (UK) MPs for English constituencies
UK MPs 1874–1880
Members of the Inner Temple
Alumni of St John's College, Cambridge
Fellows of St John's College, Cambridge
People associated with Cambridge
County Court judges (England and Wales)
English King's Counsel